Radibosh Point (‘Nos Radibosh’ \'nos 'ra-di-bosh\) is the point on the west side of the entrance to Charcot Bay forming the northeast extremity of Whittle Peninsula in the west end of Trinity Peninsula in Graham Land, Antarctic Peninsula.  Situated 2.8 km east of Cape Kater, 6.08 km northeast of Tarakchiev Point, 12.65 km north-northwest of Nikyup Point and 19.2 km west of Cape Kjellman.

The point is named after the settlement of Radibosh in western Bulgaria.

Location
German-British mapping in 1996.

Map
 Trinity Peninsula. Scale 1:250000 topographic map No. 5697. Institut für Angewandte Geodäsie and British Antarctic Survey, 1996.

References
 Bulgarian Antarctic Gazetteer. Antarctic Place-names Commission. (details in Bulgarian, basic data in English)
 Radibosh Point. SCAR Composite Antarctic Gazetteer

External links
 Radibosh Point. Copernix satellite image

Headlands of Trinity Peninsula
Bulgaria and the Antarctic